Saurita myrrhina is a moth in the subfamily Arctiinae. It was described by Max Wilhelm Karl Draudt in 1931. It is found in Brazil.

References

Moths described in 1931
Saurita